David Newton Lumsdaine (born 31 October 1931) is an Australian composer.  He studied at the New South Wales Conservatorium of Music (as it was then known).  He moved to England in 1952 and for a while shared a flat with fellow expatriate, the poet Peter Porter, with whom he collaborated on several projects including the cantata Annotations of Auschwitz (1964). In London he studied composition at the Royal Academy of Music with Lennox Berkeley. In 1970 he took a lecturing position at Durham University.  In 1981 he took a post as senior lecturer at King's College London. He is published by The University of York Music Press and Universal Edition.

In 1979 he married the composer Nicola LeFanu.

Works
Lumsdaine has disowned all works he composed before Annotations of Auschwitz (1964).  His first acknowledged works were composed using a variety of pitch and rhythm techniques associated with serialism - techniques such as pitch rotation or permutation, and isorhythmic structures linking pitch and duration together.  Central to all of Lumsdaine's work is the notion of 'ground', a term borrowed from Baroque musical terminology (specifically Purcell).  Lumsdaine's grounds are rarely literal repeated bass-lines, though superimposed rhythmic periodicities can be a feature.  More commonly, the ground is a strict harmonic-temporal framework from which the music departs and to which it returns in many different ways through the work.  Sometimes - as in 'Mandala V' - the ground is a slow-moving chord progression, a kind of background harmony whose progressions and changes underpin the structure of the work.  One of Lumsdaine's main personal contributions to the evolution of serial technique is his development of the 'Gemini' matrix - a manner of slowly transferring from the pitch content of one hexachord to another.

Lumsdaine was much affected by the later works of Anton Webern, though his music sounds very different from the many other composers of the fifties and sixties who were interested in this composer.  Webern's use of symmetrical harmonic fields to focus and control the vertical functioning of his polyphony was a crucial stimulus.  Lumsdaine's own harmonic language has elements of symmetry and intervallic limitation, and though usually derived from 12-pitch sets, is rarely strictly chromatic.  In his masterly piano work 'Kelly Ground' (1966) the harmonic ground is a characteristic chordal area which, although dissonant overall, contains numerous quasi-diatonic subsets, with the interval of perfect fourth especially prominent.  The overall progression of the work is towards the elimination of all extraneous pitch elements until only the ground itself remains.

On the rhythmic front, 'Kelly Ground' is derived from the polyrhythmic superimposition of pulses in simple ratios, an image evoking the tolling of bells, which also comes into clearest focus in the final sections of the work.  Whether or not the listener is aware of any of these technical concerns, the work makes a startlingly direct and expressive impact in performance.  The piano writing is resourcefully varied, from the lyrically evocative 'aria for Kelly' (section 4) to the ferociously rebarbative 'aubade' which precedes it.  The haunting final section is daringly simple and affecting in its naked harmonic focus, being perhaps equalled only by the similarly bold conclusion of Copland's Piano Sonata in this regard.

As its title suggests, 'Kelly Ground' is partly an evocation of the tragic history of the Australian folk hero, Ned Kelly.  Lumsdaine had originally envisaged an opera (to a libretto by Peter Porter) but they abandoned a literal treatment of the subject, and Lumsdaine's piano work does not narrate Kelly's story directly.  A staunch opposer of capital punishment, Lumsdaine sees Kelly's execution by hanging as a terrible symbol of human rights abuse and injustice.  Though initially somewhat reticent about this matter in relation to 'Kelly Ground', the composer has more recently indicated that the work also relates execution of the Rosenbergs, who were killed in the United States in the fifties for spying activities at the height of the cold war, amidst a storm of international protest and widespread revulsion.  The 4-minute duration of each section of Lumsdaine's work is itself a direct reference to the time taken to execute the Rosenbergs.  Thus behind one of Lumsdaine's strictest serially-derived pieces lies a typically deep humanitarian concern, which informs all his work.

Lumsdaine's subsequent output joins this concern for human issues to a lasting passion for and fascination with the natural world.  Lumsdaine is an esteemed ornithologist, whose field recordings of Australian birdsong are internationally admired as valuable aural documents of the Australian soundscape.  'Aria for Edward John Eyre' (1972) bring these twin concerns together in a beautifully paced dramatic setting of extracts from Eyre's journal covering his near-fatal crossing of the Australian Bight.  Set for two narrators, soprano solo, doublebass solo, ensemble and live electronics, it offers a sophisticated fusion of the diverse sound sources into what is in effect a 50-minute dramatic cantata of great power.  It is also one of the first works in Lumsdaine's output specifically and vividly evoking Australian natural landscapes, though at that time the composer had not seen them for nearly twenty years.

The orchestral works 'Salvation Creek with Eagle' and 'Hagoromo' (1974 and 1977 respectively) continue and develop Lumsdaine's personal take on Australian nature.  They are not in any sense programmatic works, but as Lumsdaine has pointed out in a 1983 BBC interview, 'the textures contain smells - one's senses run one into the other'.  In musical terms, his by now colourful and versatile harmonic style enables him to control orchestral resources with expertise, as areas of vast harmonic resonance and density are contrasted with passages of limpid simplicity.  In 'Salvation Creek', the sense of spaciousness is achieved with recourse to increasingly consonant subsets of the serial matrix, which serve as areas of relaxation in contrast to the occasional violent outbursts.  'Hagoromo', composed for Pierre Boulez and the BBC Symphony Orchestra, is in many ways the summation of Lumsdaine's orchestral output: a complex, 3-movement structure replete with internal cross-references, yet for all that clearly put across to the uninitiated listener.  The fast-slow-fast plan is framed by a carefully varied refrain of resonant chords in the brass (accompanied by bass drums).  Although the work takes its title from a Japanese Noh Play, it is in effect a celebration of the beauties of nature generally - 'an idealised everywhere', as the critic Paul Griffiths admiringly put it.  Whether in the long melodic arches of the slow central section, or the joyous dancing of the last part, the orchestral sonorities are acutely judged, and instantly recognisable as Lumsdaine.  Again the harmonic style is clearly focussed with contrasting sections focussing on various modal sub-groups, yet the overall impression is of effortless richness and luminosity.  At both its Paris premiere, and its eventual London premiere in 1983, the work generated enormous acclaim from both audiences and critics.

Lumsdaine's output also includes two other fine substantial piano works - notably the Bach-inspired 'Ruhe Sanfte, Sanfte Ruh' (1974) - and a considerable number of works involving electronics.  His extraordinary tape montage/re-composition of events from the Durham Miners Gala 'Big Meeting' is perhaps the finest of these.  There are many substantial chamber works, including the series of works entitled 'Mandala', a cello concerto, several song cycles and an orchestral fifth 'Mandala' (1989), another colourful homage to his favourite Australian landscapes and soundscapes.  Shortly after composing his dense and energetic 'Kali Dances' for ensemble in 1996, Lumsdaine retired from composition, so that an overview of his oeuvre is already possible, unusually for a living composer.

Taken as a whole, Lumsdaine's output is remarkably consistent in its levels of invention, beauty and daring.  If there are perhaps works in which length is not always justified by the material, these are in a small minority.  A typical Lumsdaine work will be a serious, intense and sensuously exhilarating experience for performers and listeners alike.  Right from his earliest acknowledged work, he has refused to use pure constructivism as an end in itself.  Expressive honesty, a keen ear for the wonders of sound and an obvious passion for the world around us are the dominating characteristics of an output which is surely overdue to be recognised as one of the finest of his generation, and by any Australian-born composer to date.

The following is a list of Lumsdaine's acknowledged works:

Ballet
1973: Meridian (percussion, piano, tape)

Chamber
1968: Mandala I (wind quintet)

1969: Mandala II (flute, clarinet, percussion, viola, cello)

1971: Kangaroo Hunt (piano, percussion)

1978: Mandala III (solo piano, flute, clarinet, viola, cello, bell)

1983: Mandala IV (string quartet)

1985: Bagatelles (flute, clarinet, piano, violin, viola, cello)

1986: Empty Sky – Mootwingee (flute, trombone/horn, cello, 2 percussionists, 2 pianos)

1988: A Dance and a Hymn for Alexander Maconochie (flute, clarinet, percussion, mandolin, guitar, violin, double bass)

1989: Round Dance (sitar, tabla, flute, cello, keyboard)

1990: Sine nomine (alto saxophone/bass clarinet, percussion

1993: Rain Drums (4 percussionists)

1994: Kali Dances (flute, oboe, clarinet, trumpet, tuba, vibraphone, piano, violin, viola, cello, double bass

Choral

1975: Dum medium silentium (SATB)

1985: Where the lilies grow (8 voices)

Incidental Music

1991: The Crane (flute, percussion, harp, synthesizer)

Orchestral

1968-9 Episodes (orchestra)

1974: Salvation Creek with Eagle (chamber orchestra)

1975: Sunflower (chamber orchestra)

1975: A Little Dance of Hagoromo (orchestra)

1977: Hagoromo (large orchestra)

1982: Shoalhaven (orchestra)

1988: Mandala V (orchestra)

1990: The Arc of Stars (string orchestra)

1992: A Garden of Earthly Delights (cello, orchestra)

Other

1990: 2 Just So Stories (The Elephant's Child, The Sing Song of Old Man Kangaroo) (narrator, dancer, live electronics)

Piano

1966: Kelly Ground

1967: Flights (2 pianos)

1974: Ruhe sanfte, sanfte Ruh'

1980: Cambewarra, 1980

1994: 6 Postcard Pieces

Solo Cello

1992: Blue upon Blue

Solo Shakuhachi

1993: Curlew in the Mist

Sopranino Recorder

1994: Metamorphosis at Mullet Creek

Vocal 

1964: Annotations of Auschwitz (soprano, flute + bass flute, trumpet, horn, piano, violin, cello)

1966, rev. 71: Easter Fresco (soprano, flute, horn, harp, piano)

1974: My Sister's Song (soprano)

1982: What shall I sing? (soprano, 2 clarinets)

1990: A Tree Telling of Orpheus (soprano, flute, clarinet, violin, viola, cello)

1992: A Norfolk Song Book (soprano recorders/flutes)

1993: A Child's Grace (voice, oboe, harp)

References

Further reading
 Gilbert, A: 'Lumsdaine, David', Grove Music Online (Accessed 7 July 2006)
Hall, Michael: Between Two Worlds: The Music of David Lumsdaine Arc Publications (2003)
Hooper, Michael. The Music of David Lumsdaine: 'Kelly Ground' to 'Cambewarra'  Ashgate, 2012. 

1931 births
21st-century classical composers
20th-century classical composers
Academics of Durham University
Academics of King's College London
Alumni of the Royal Academy of Music
Australian classical composers
Australian male classical composers
Living people
Sydney Conservatorium of Music alumni
20th-century Australian male musicians
20th-century Australian musicians
21st-century Australian male musicians
21st-century Australian musicians